Fardis County is in Alborz province, Iran. The capital of the county is the city of Fardis. The region was separated from Karaj County in 2012 to become Fardis County. At the 2016 census, the county's population was 271,829 in 86,619 households.

Administrative divisions

The population of Fardis County's administrative divisions at the last census is shown in the following table. The census shows two districts, four rural districts, and two cities.

The Central District of the county consists of three parts:
Fardis Rural District is coextensive with the village of Sepiddasht, whose population at the 2006 census was 1,418 in 372 households. At that time it was in the Mohammadabad Rural District of the Central District of Karaj County, Tehran province. At the 2016 census, it had increased to 3,338 people in 1,019 households.

Vahdat Rural District is coextensive with the village of Sarhadabad, whose population at the 2016 census was 3,617 in 1,157 households.

The city of Fardis had a population in 2016 of 181,174 people in 58,953 households.

Meshkin Dasht District also consists of three parts:

Farrokhabad Rural District is coextensive with the village of Farrokhabad, whose population at the 2006 census was 6,383 in 1,593 households, when it was in the Mohammadabad Rural District of the Central District of Karaj County, Tehran province. The 2016 census showed a decrease to 5,407 people in 1,675 households.

Meshkinabad Rural District consists of two villages: Agricultural Engineering Town, with a population of 16,104 in 5,120 households; and The Soil Science and Soil Fertility Center, with a population of 184 in 51 households at the 2016 census.

The city of Meshkin Dasht had a population at the 2006 census of 43,696 in 11,171 households when it was among the six cities of the Central District of Karaj County at that time. By the latest census in 2016, the population had risen to 62,005 in 18,644 households, about a third the size of Fardis and the only other city in the county.

References 

Fardis County

Cities in Alborz Province

Populated places in Alborz Province

Populated places in Fardis County